Sam Roi Yot (lit. 'three hundred spires') is a district (amphoe) in the northern part of Prachuap Khiri Khan province, central Thailand.

History
The minor district (king amphoe) Sam Roi Yot was created on 1 April 1995 by splitting tambons Rai Kao, Sila Loi, and Sam Roi Yot from Pran Buri district.

On 7 September 1995 tambon Sala Lai was created by splitting off six mubans from Rai Kao. On 1 January 1996 the subdistrict Rai Mai was reassigned from Kui Buri district to the minor district.

On 15 May 2007, all 81 minor districts in Thailand were upgraded to full districts. With publication in the Royal Gazette on 24 August, the upgrade became official.

The British diplomat John Crawfurd visited the area in 1822 during the mission described in his book Journal of an Embassy from the Governor-General of India to the Courts of Siam and Cochin-China: Exhibiting a View of the Actual State of Those Kingdoms. He reported that it was then already called Sam Roi Yot and described the view of the coast as "novel and imposing".

Geography
Neighbouring districts are Pran Buri to the north and Kui Buri to the south. To the west is the Tanintharyi Division of Myanmar, to the east the Gulf of Thailand.

At the shore of the gulf is Khao Sam Roi Yot National Park, the first coastal national park of Thailand, established in 1966.

Administration

Central administration 
Sam Roi Yot is divided into five sub-districts (tambons), which are further subdivided into 41 administrative villages (mubans).

Local administration 
There are two sub-district municipalities (thesaban tambons) in the district:
 Rai Mai consisting of parts of sub-districts Sam Krathai (Kui Buri District) and Rai Mai.
 Rai Kao consisting of parts of sub-districts Rai Kao and Salalai.

There are five sub-district administrative organizations (SAO) in the district:
 Sam Roi Yot consisting of sub-district Sam Roi Yot.
 Sila Loi consisting of sub-district Sila Loi.
 Rai Kao consisting of parts of sub-district Rai Kao.
 Salalai consisting of parts of sub-district Salalai.
 Rai Mai consisting of parts of sub-district Rai Mai.

References

External links

 amphoe.com

Sam Roi Yot